A tattletale is someone who reports others' wrongdoings.

Tattletale, or variant, may also refer to:

 Tattle Tale, an American folk punk rock group
 Tattle Tales, a 1920 musical and comedy revue with Jimmy Hussey
 Tattletale, an alias of the Marvel comics character Franklin Richards
 TattleTales (album), a 2020 album by 6ix9ine

See also
 Tattletail, a survival horror video game
 Tattler (disambiguation)
 Tatler (disambiguation)
 Informant